The Jochköpfl (also: Feuerspitz) is a mountain, in the Latten Mountains in the Berchtesgaden Alps. It is located in the German federal state of Bavaria.

External links 
Jochköpfl in BayernViewer

One-thousanders of Germany
Berchtesgaden Alps
Berchtesgadener Land